Zheng Ji (6 May 1900 – 29 July 2010) also known as Libin T. Cheng (his last name was spelled as Cheng in the Wade-Giles system before Pinyin was used to spell the names of Chinese people and places), was a Chinese nutritionist and a pioneering biochemist. He was reputed to be the world's oldest professor and the founder of modern nutrition science in China, having lived to the age of 110.

Early life 
Libin T. Cheng was born in Nanxi County, Sichuan Province, China. 

In 1924 Zheng Ji passed the entrance exam for the National Southeastern University (originally known as the Nanjing Advanced Normal School and renamed the National Central University in 1928, and then the Nanjing University)and studied at the biology department. 

In 1930 he went to America to study, majoring in biochemistry at Ohio State University and earned his M.S. in 1931. He also attended Yale and Indiana University, and obtained his PhD from Indiana University in 1934. 

In the same year, he was elected to membership of the Sigma Xi Society based on his research achievement and potential.

Career 
As early as 1931, Cheng became a member of the American Branch of The Science Society of  China  and had his co-authored research paper “Motor Localization on the Cerebral Cortex of the Guinea-pig (Cavia Cobaya)” published in The Journal of Comparative Neurology.

Returning to China in 1934, Cheng “took charge of establishing the Department of Physiological Chemistry in the Biological Laboratory of the Science Society of China” 

He successively served both as a professor and the director of the Department of Biochemistry in the Medical School of National Central University. Simultaneously, he taught at the Eastern China Military Medical School and at the Number 4 Military Medical College. Since 1950, Cheng had worked both as a biology professor and the head of the Department of Biochemistry department at the Nanjing Medical University.

In 1945, at the Medical School of National Central University, he established a biochemistry research institute to train graduate students.  This was the first formal organization in China to teach biochemistry to graduate students, training a large number of students who went on to work in a variety of fields.  After turning 70 he began to study the biochemistry of old age, proposing a theory of metabolic imbalance, forming the basis of geriatric biochemistry in China.

He participated in the establishment of the Chinese Nutrition Society and, later on, the Biochemistry Society.  He was a past chairman of the Central University Professors Association and the first council chair of the Chinese Nutrition Society. He had written many teaching materials and writing textbooks. Some of his textbooks are still in use, such as General Biochemistry.

After the age of 100, he still taught and wrote books. He received many honorable certificates and awards in China and abroad. 

In 2010, Dr. E. Gordon Gee, president of the Ohio State University visited Zheng(Cheng) in Nanjing.

Zheng turned 110 in May 2010 and at the time was claimed to be the oldest professor living in the world. He spent the greater part of his life teaching at the medical school and biology department of Nanjing University. He died on 29 July 2010. He was list as one of the great minds in China’s biophysics in the older generation of biophysicists in China.

Award
21st-Century Award for Achievement, International Biographical Centre of Cambridge, England, 2003 
International Man of the Year of 1992-1933 from the International Biographical Centre of Cambridge, England, 1993
A golden key fob from Sigma Xi, 1934

See also
List of centenarians (scientists and mathematicians)

References

Chinese food scientists
Nutritionists
Chinese supercentenarians
Men supercentenarians
1900 births
2010 deaths
National Central University alumni
Nanjing University alumni
Writers from Yibin
Educators from Sichuan
Academic staff of the National Central University
Chemists from Sichuan
Chinese biochemists
Yale University alumni
Indiana University alumni
Ohio University alumni
Biologists from Sichuan